A list of films produced in South Korea in 1982:

References

External links
1982 in South Korea

 1980-1989 at www.koreanfilm.org

1982
South Korean
1982 in South Korea